Polybotryoideae is a subfamily of the fern family Dryopteridaceae.

Genera
The Pteridophyte Phylogeny Group classification of 2016 (PPG I) accepts the following genera:
 Cyclodium C.Presl
 Maxonia C.Chr
 Olfersia Raddi
 Polybotrya Humb. & Bonpl. ex Willd.
 Polystichopsis (J.Sm.) C.Chr.
 Stigmatocarpum L.Bolus
 Stigmatopteris C.Chr.
 Trichoneuron Ching

References

Dryopteridaceae
Plant subfamilies